Saint Vitalis of Milan was an early Christian martyr and saint.

Biography
His legend relates that Vitalis was a wealthy citizen of Milan, perhaps a soldier. He was married to Valeria of Milan. They are supposed to have been the parents of the (perhaps legendary) Saints Gervasius and Protasius.

According to legend, Vitalis was an officer who accompanied the judge Paulinus from Milan to Ravenna. He encouraged Saint Ursicinus of Ravenna to be steadfast at his execution, and himself gave Ursicinus honorable burial. Vitalis was discovered to be a Christian. Paulinus ordered Vitalis to be racked and then thrown into a deep pit and covered with stones and earth.

The date of his martyrdom is uncertain: some sources say that he was a victim of Nero; others, of Marcus Aurelius. He was martyred in Ravenna, but all else in the story is suspect. "Many scholars believe that the narrative is partly fanciful, recognising in the characters mentioned, other martyrs of the same name venerated both in Milan and Ravenna."

Veneration
Saint Vitalis is honoured as the principal patron of the city of Ravenna.

The feast day of Saint Vitalis is 28 April. Churches are dedicated in honor of Saint Vitalis at Assisi, and Rome, in Italy and at Jadera (now Zadar) in Dalmatia (now Croatia), but by far the most famous church bearing his name is the octagonal Basilica of San Vitale at Ravenna, a masterpiece of Byzantine art, erected on the purported site of his martyrdom. He is also the patron saint of Granarolo and Marittima in Italy.

The Cebu Metropolitan Cathedral recognizes Saint Vitalis as its patron. A Mass to commemorate the 75th anniversary of Cebu's elevation to an archdiocese and the feast day of Vitalis was held on 28 April 2009, with the Archbishop of Cebu Cardinal Ricardo Vidal presiding.

A statue of Vitalis is one of those on the colonnade of St Peter's Basilica.

References

Sources
Patron Saints: Vitalis of Milan

External links
Colonnade Statue St Peter's Square
 "Saints Vitalis and Valeria of Milan: The Iconography" 

1st-century Romans
2nd-century Romans
Christian saints in unknown century
Saints from Roman Italy
Ante-Nicene Christian martyrs
Premature burials
Deaths by live burial
Year of birth unknown